Sergei Gennadyevich Nikolaev (born 8 June 1972) is a Russian retired professional ice hockey goaltender.

Career 
Nikolaev played in the Russian Superleague for Kristall Saratov, Torpedo Yaroslavl, Khimik Voskresensk, Lada Togliatti, Severstal Cherepovets, SKA Saint Petersburg, Salavat Yulaev Ufa, Sibir Novosibirsk and Metallurg Novokuznetsk. He also spent three seasons with Ak Bars Kazan in the Superleague's successor Kontinental Hockey League but didn't play a game for the team.

References

External links

1972 births
Living people
HC Khimik Voskresensk players
HC Lada Togliatti players
Lokomotiv Yaroslavl players
Metallurg Novokuznetsk players
Sportspeople from Saratov
Russian ice hockey goaltenders
Salavat Yulaev Ufa players
Severstal Cherepovets players
SKA Saint Petersburg players
HC Sibir Novosibirsk players